Carybdea branchi, the South African box jellyfish, is a venomous species of cnidarian, in the small family Carybdeidae within the class Cubozoa.

Description
It has a transparent box-shaped bell with a very long tentacle trailing from each corner.

The C. branchi is described as being robust and having a well sculpted in particular, single rooted with multiple stems, velarial canals 2 per octant, pedalia knee bend upwards turned volcano shaped. Also known to have a brownish pigmentation of the phacellae and pedalia. [3]

Distribution
This jellyfish is found from the north of Namibia and around the South African coast to Port Elizabeth from the surface to a depth of at least  underwater.

Ecology
This jellyfish is often seen in swarms. The tentacles have a painful sting, although the sting is not known to be fatal. It is eaten by the sunfishes, Mola mola and Mola ramsayi, as well as the slender sunfish, Ranzania laevis.

References

3. Acevedo et al. 2019. Revision of the genus Carybdea (Cnidaria: Cubozoa: Carybdeidae): clarifying the identity of its type species Carybdea marsupialis. Zootaxa.

Carybdeidae
Invertebrates of South Africa
Animals described in 2009